Roosevelt Avenue and Greenpoint Avenue are main thoroughfares in the New York City boroughs of Queens and Brooklyn. Roosevelt Avenue begins at 48th Street and Queens Boulevard in the neighborhood of Sunnyside. West of Queens Boulevard, the road is named Greenpoint Avenue and continues through Sunnyside and Long Island City across the Greenpoint Avenue Bridge into the borough of Brooklyn, terminating at WNYC Transmitter Park on the East River in the neighborhood of Greenpoint. Roosevelt Avenue goes through Woodside, Jackson Heights, Elmhurst, Corona, Flushing Meadows–Corona Park (adjacent to Citi Field) and Flushing. In Flushing, Roosevelt Avenue ends at 156th Street and Northern Boulevard.

The  trains run on the elevated IRT Flushing Line tracks above the street with ten stations until it reaches Flushing – Main Street, its eastern terminus.  The rail line opened in 1917, when Roosevelt Avenue was formed from the combination of other streets into one main avenue.  The street, itself named after Theodore Roosevelt and Franklin D. Roosevelt, provides the name for the Roosevelt Avenue / 74th Street station ( trains) in Jackson Heights. The  train stops at the Greenpoint Avenue station located at Greenpoint Avenue and Manhattan Avenue. Roosevelt Avenue was nationally recognized for its cuisine when Good Magazine named it one of "America's Tastiest Streets".  

Roosevelt Avenue is well known for its diversity of cultural representation, ranging from Indian to Latin American, while in the 2020s, Downtown Flushing is undergoing rapid gentrification by Chinese transnational entities. More than three hundred languages are spoken along the street, and the neighborhoods it passes through are described as the most ethnically diverse in the world.

Structures along the avenues include Eberhard Faber Pencil Factory on the western end of Greenpoint Avenue and the Newtown Creek Wastewater Treatment Plant just west of the Greenpoint Avenue Bridge. The eastern end of Roosevelt Avenue contains the Protestant Reformed Dutch Church of Flushing.

References

Streets in Queens, New York
Streets in Brooklyn